The discography of LeToya Luckett, an American R&B singer-songwriter consists of three studio albums, eight singles, four promotional singles and six music videos.

LeToya debuted at number one on the U.S. Billboard 200 with first week sales of 165,000 copies and at number one on the Billboard Top R&B/Hip-Hop Albums chart, becoming the second Destiny's Child member to reach that position on SoundScan Mainstream Chart as a solo artist. To date, the album has sold over 529,000 copies according to Nielsen Soundscan, and has been certified Platinum by the RIAA for shipping over a million copies. The first single from the album was "You Got What I Need", with non-commercial purpose, but "All Eyes on Me", the second single, is claimed as her "original" first single, as this is the first track that showcased her as a solo artist. "Torn", the first official single from the album which was released in March 2006 and soon became a hit having a high airplay, just missing out the top thirty on the U.S. Billboard Hot 100 charts at number thirty one, nevertheless still becoming a top 40 hit. "Torn" became a hit on the U.S. Hot R&B/Hip-Hop Songs, peaking at number two. It also entered the top twenty on the Rhythmic Top 40 and Adult R&B charts. In the same year, the song was finally released worldwide, namely the United Kingdom, New Zealand, and Australia and became a moderate worldwide hit.

In the U.S., Lady Love opened with first week sales of 32,900 copies, debuting at the top of the Billboard Top R&B/Hip-Hop Albums chart, replacing Ledisi's Turn Me Loose, on September 12, 2009, where it spent a total of thirty-two weeks and number twelve on the Billboard 200, where it spent a total of twelve weeks. Though fairly successful commercially, the album failed to match or better the sales or chart performance of its predecessor and did not chart outside of the United States. As of April 2010, the album has sold 132,000 copies to date. "Not Anymore", the lead single, was released in February 2009, and peaked at number eighteen on US Billboard Hot R&B/Hip-Hop Songs
"She Ain't Got..." the album's second single, peaking at number thirty-nine on the Billboard Rhythmic Top 40 chart, while peaking at number seventy-five on the Billboard Pop 100 Airplay chart and number twenty on the Billboard Hot Dance Club Play. However, the single was most successful in Japan where it peaked at number forty-nine on the Japan Hot 100. "Regret", featuring rapper Ludacris, was released as the third single – based only on downloads and airplay – "Regret" peaked at number eight on the US Billboard Hot R&B/Hip-Hop Songs chart and debuted at number one-hundred on the Billboard Hot 100, peaking at number seventy-eight. "Good To Me", was released on February 11, 2010.

Albums

Studio albums

Singles

As a lead artist

As a featured artist

Promotional singles

Miscellaneous

Album appearances

Soundtrack appearances

Music videos

As lead artist

Other appearances

See also
Destiny's Child discography

References

Discography
Discographies of American artists
Rhythm and blues discographies